793 Naval Air Squadron (793 NAS) was a Naval Air Squadron of the Royal Navy's Fleet Air Arm. It was formed in 1939 at RNAS Ford and remained active throughout to 1945, as an Air Towed Target Unit, as part of No.1 Observer School. From 1940 to disbandment it operated at RNAS Piarco (HMS Goshawk), Trinidad.

History of 793 NAS

Air Towed Target Unit (1939 - 1945) 

793 Naval Air Squadron formed at RNAS Ford (HMS Perigrine), located at Ford, in West Sussex, England, on the 25 October 1939, as an Air Towed Target Unit and operating Blackburn Roc Mk.I aircraft.

On the 18 August 1940, a formation of Junkers Ju 87, or Stuka, dive bombers, attacked RNAS Ford as part of a large Luftwaffe force attacking airfields around Hampshire and Sussex. 28 personnel were killed and 75 wounded in the raid, which also destroyed 17 aircraft, damaged 26 more and caused significant infrastructure damage.

The raid prompted 793 NAS to be stood down and moved to RNAS Lee-on-Solent (HMS Daedalus), situated near Lee-on-the-Solent in Hampshire, England, in preparation for sailing to relocate to Trinidad and Tobago, located in the Caribbean, operating from RNAS Piarco, on the island of Trinidad, which began on the 18 November 1940.

The squadron's role was to support the training of observers for the Fleet Air Arm. It formed part of the No. 1 Observer School operating out of RNAS Piarco, working alongside three Observer Training Squadrons: 749 Naval Air Squadron,750 Naval Air Squadron and 752 Naval Air Squadron. Here, 793 NAS also operated Miles Martinet T.T.1 for target towing, Fairey Fulmar British carrier-borne reconnaissance aircraft/fighter aircraft, and Fairey Albacore single-engine biplane torpedo bomber aircraft.

793 NAS operated from RNAS Piarco for the remainder of World War II, finally disbanding there on the 10 October 1945.

Aircraft flown 

The squadron has flown a number of different aircraft types, including:
Blackburn Roc Mk.1
Miles Martinet T.T.1
Fairey Fulmar Mk.II
Fairey Albacore Mk.I

Naval Air Stations  

793 Naval Air Squadron operated from a number of naval air stations of the Royal Navy, both in the UK and overseas:
Royal Naval Air Station FORD (25 October 1939 - 1 October 1940)
Royal Naval Air Station LEE-ON-SOLENT (1 October 1940 - 12 October 1940)
-transit- (12 October 1940 - 18 October 1940)
Royal Naval Air Station PIARCO (18 October 1940 - 10 October 1945)

Commanding Officers 

List of commanding officers of 793 Naval Air Squadron with month and year of appointment and end:

Lt (A) J. N. Gladich, RNVR (Oct 1939-Aug 1940)
Lt-Cdr (A) K. D. R. Davis, RNVR (Nov 1940-Jun 1944)
Lt-Cdr (A) F. C. Booth, RNVR (Jun 1944-Dec 1944)
Lt-Cdr (A) F. B. Gardner, RNVR (Dec 1944-Aug 1945)
Lt-Cdr (A) S. J. McDowell, RNVR (Aug 1945-Oct 1945)

References

Citations

Bibliography

700 series Fleet Air Arm squadrons
Military units and formations established in 1939
Military units and formations of the Royal Navy in World War II